Ozamia fuscomaculella is a species of snout moth in the genus Ozamia. It was described by William S. Wright in 1916. It is found in the US state of California.

Adults are on wing in July and August.

The larvae feed on Opuntia littoralis. They feed on the flowers and fruit of the host plant.

Taxonomy
The former subspecies Ozamia fuscomaculella clarefacta has been raised to species status as Ozamia clarefacta.

References

Phycitini
Moths of North America
Endemic fauna of California
Fauna of the California chaparral and woodlands
Moths described in 1916
Fauna without expected TNC conservation status